The Beach Haven School District is a community public school district that serves students in pre-kindergarten through sixth grade from Beach Haven, in Ocean County, New Jersey, United States.

As of the 2018–19 school year, the district, comprising one school, had an enrollment of 55 students and 12.0 classroom teachers (on an FTE basis), for a student–teacher ratio of 4.6:1. In the 2016–17 school year, Beach Haven had the 3rd-smallest enrollment of any school district in the state, with 70 students.

The district is classified by the New Jersey Department of Education as being in District Factor Group "FG", the fourth-highest of eight groupings. District Factor Groups organize districts statewide to allow comparison by common socioeconomic characteristics of the local districts. From lowest socioeconomic status to highest, the categories are A, B, CD, DE, FG, GH, I and J.

For seventh through twelfth grades, public school students attend the Southern Regional School District, which serves the five municipalities in the Long Beach Island Consolidated School District (Barnegat Light, Harvey Cedars, Long Beach Township, Ship Bottom and Surf City), along with students from Beach Haven and Stafford Township, as well as the sending district of Ocean Township. Schools in the district (with 2018–19 enrollment data from the National Center for Education Statistics) are 
Southern Regional Middle School with 934 students in grades 7–8 and 
Southern Regional High School with 1,952 students in grades 9–12. Both schools are in the Manahawkin section of Stafford Township.

School
Beach Haven Elementary School, the district's lone school, served 52 students in pre-kindergarten through sixth grade as of the 2018–19 school year.

Administration
Core members of the district's administration are:
Dr. Christopher Meyrick, Superintendent
Steve Terhune, Business Administrator / Board Secretary

Board of education
The district's board of education, with five members, sets policy and oversees the fiscal and educational operation of the district through its administration. As a Type II school district, the board's trustees are elected directly by voters to serve three-year terms of office on a staggered basis, with either one or two seats up for election each year held (since 2012) as part of the November general election. The board appoints a superintendent to oversee the day-to-day operation of the district.

References

External links
Beach Haven Elementary School
Beach Haven Elementary School page on Borough website
 
School Data for the Beach Haven Elementary School, National Center for Education Statistics
Southern Regional School District

Beach Haven, New Jersey
New Jersey District Factor Group FG
School districts in Ocean County, New Jersey
Long Beach Island
Public elementary schools in New Jersey